Bardon Hill Quarry is a  geological Site of Special Scientific Interest east of Coalville in Leicestershire. It is a Geological Conservation Review site.

This quarry has been operated for over 400 years and produces three million tonnes of rock a year, 15% of UK output. It exposes rocks from an andesitic Precambrian volcano, similar to the 1995 Montserrat eruption, about 570 million years ago. There are veins of quartz containing copper and gold.

There is no public access to the site.

References

Sites of Special Scientific Interest in Leicestershire
Geological Conservation Review sites